Leonia is a genus of tropical small trees or shrubs. It was named by Hipólito Ruiz López in 1794.

Violaceae
Malpighiales genera